The Kharmang District (Urdu:) is one of the 14 districts of Pakistan-administered territory of Gilgit-Baltistan, bounded on the north by the Skardu District, on the north-east by the Ghanche District, on the south by the Kargil District and the Leh District of [Ladakh,India], and on the west by the Astore District. Its district headquarters is at Tolti. Located in the district is the Kharmang Valley, which is one of the five main valleys in the Baltistan Division.

Education
According to the Alif Ailaan Pakistan District Education Rankings 2017, Kharmang was ranked 119th out of 155 districts with respect to school infrastructure and
facilities.

References

 
Districts of Gilgit-Baltistan